Stephen Namara (born February 28, 1953 in Kenya) is an American Contemporary figurative artist.

Life and work

His drawings capture the fluidity of the subject and the mystery of its subtext, leaving the paper to reveal traces of the process. His paintings are brought forth in deep colors, rich in texture and evoking a depth and humanity which are sensuously realized. In 2002, Roger Downey said in Seattle Weekly: "We tend to think of drawing as a small-scale monochrome medium, but some of the most impressive pieces on view here are large and marvelously colored. Stephen Namara places a voluptuous reclining nude, all curves and soft shadings, against severe geometric background rendered in the same muted tones."

Solo exhibitions

1981 San Francisco State University, San Francisco, CA
1986 Shenandoah Gallery, Sacramento, CA
1988 Haines Gallery, San Francisco, CA
1990 Merced College Art Gallery, Merced, CA
1990 Haines Gallery, San Francisco, CA
1991 "Stephen Namara Recent Works", Fairfield Art Center, Fairfield, CA
1992 Haines Gallery, San Francisco, CA
1992 Koplin Gallery, Santa Monica, CA
1993 Koplin Gallery, Santa Monica, CA
1994 Haines Gallery, San Francisco, CA
1994 Koplin Gallery, Santa Monica, CA
1997 Koplin Gallery, Los Angeles, CA
1999 Koplin Gallery, Los Angeles, CA
1999 "New Drawings By Stephen Namara", Dolby Chadwick Gallery, San Francisco, CA
2002 Koplin Gallery, Los Angeles, CA
2003 Dolby Chadwick Gallery, San Francisco, CA
2005 "Allusions and Variations", Koplin del Rio Gallery, Los Angeles, CA
2009 Skyline College (Gallery), San Bruno, CA

Collections
Arkansas Art Center, Little Rock, AR
San Francisco Arts Commission
Triton Museum of Art, Santa Clara, California

References

Additional sources
Frank, Peter. "Art Picks of the Week," LA Weekly, June 1999.
Ayres, Jane. "Waxing Artistic," Peninsula Times Tribune, March 1992.
Eldridge, Jan. "Drawing on the Brain’s Right Side," The Fairfield Times, September 1992.
Telford, Anne. "Stephen Namara," Northern California Home & Garden, November 1988.
Bondy, Coleen. "Shenandoah Gallery: A Gem in the Foothill," On the Wing, February 1987.

External links

San Francisco Public Library. Artists File: Namara, Stephen (1953- )

1953 births
Living people
Realist painters
Modern artists
20th-century American painters
American male painters
21st-century American painters
21st-century American male artists
Artists from Los Angeles
20th-century American printmakers
20th-century American male artists